The Alaskan independence movement is a political movement advocating for the separation and independence of Alaska from the United States. Alaska has been one of the fifty states of the United States of America since 1959. Alaska's legal status within the United States has been disputed at times, most recently by a movement launched by Joe Vogler and the Alaskan Independence Party (AIP). Generally, the debate has surrounded the legal status of Alaska relative to the United States, and its international standing.

Background
Alaska became a territory of the United States in 1867, when it was purchased from the Russian Empire. Events in the 20th century such as World War II and the Cold War led to the decision to admit Alaska as a state. President Dwight D. Eisenhower signed the Alaska Statehood Act into law on July 7, 1958, which paved the way for Alaska's admission into the Union on January 3, 1959.

The vote for statehood was held in 1958. Voters approved the measure by a 6 to 1 margin. The United Nations decolonization committee later removed Alaska from the United Nations list of non-self-governing territories.

The debate is considered by some to resemble academic discourse being argued by several other activist groups in the United States, most notably arguments over the legal status of Hawaii and the legal status of Texas. The situation most closely resembles that of Hawaii, as the Hawaiian statehood vote also lacked an option for independence.

History
Joe Vogler began arguing about the validity of the statehood vote in 1973. Early in that year, he began circulating a petition seeking support for secession of Alaska from the United States. The Alaska magazine published a piece at that time in which Vogler claimed to have gathered 25,000 signatures in three weeks.

During the 1970s, Vogler founded the Alaskan Independence Party and Alaskans For Independence. The AIP and AFI, as Vogler explained, were intended to function as strictly separate entities, AIP primarily to explore whether the 1958 vote by Alaskans authorizing statehood was legal, and AFI primarily to actively pursue Alaska's secession from the United States.

During the 2010s, some Russian groups have advocated for the return of all or part of Alaska to Russia (which once controlled the territory as Russian America). In 2013, an ultra-conservative Russian Orthodox group, the Pchyolki ("Little Bees"), argued that President Obama's support of gay marriage invalidated the original sale, since "We see it as our duty to protect their [Orthodox Alaskans'] right to freely practice their religion, which allows no tolerance to sin." In 2014, the mayor of Yakutsk cited documents from the 19th century deeding Spruce Island to the Russian Orthodox Church "for eternity". (Spruce Island was home to Herman of Alaska, a missionary to Native Alaskans who is one of the most-loved Orthodox Christian saints.)

American media reports interpreted the Yakutsk mayor's words as a claim that Spruce Island still belonged to Russia, not the United States. It could also be interpreted as asserting that the Russian Church should own the island under U.S. law. The Russian government does not claim Spruce Island, and neither does the Russian Orthodox Church, which ceded its administrative control over Alaska's holy sites when it granted autocephaly to the Orthodox Church in America in 1970.

See also

 Legal status of Hawaii
 Legal status of Texas
 Republic of Texas (group)
 Tribal sovereignty

References

Legal history of Alaska
Nationalisms
Political history of Alaska
Separatism in the United States